Darnes Sports Club is a Libyan football club based in Derna, Libya. The team once reached second in the 1965–1966 Libyan Premier League season, by winning 2–1 in Derna but lost the 2nd leg in Tripoli 2–0 against Ittihad Tripoli. The team has notable former players such as Ahmed Souleimen Neffati Idris Mikraz, ِِAnis Mikraz, and Abdulhaq Al Tashani.

External links 
darnes.ly 
Club logo (archived 2 May 2014)

Darnes
1958 establishments in Libya